is located in Funabashi, Chiba, Japan. It is used for horse racing. It has a capacity of 165,676. It was built in 1990.

Physical attributes
Nakayama Race Course has two grass courses, a dirt course, and a jump course. 

The turf's  measures 1840m (1 1/8 miles + 97 feet) with a 1600m and a 2200m chute, and the  measures 1667m (1 mile + 189 feet) with a 1400m chute. Races can be run on the "A Course" rail setting (on the hedge), the "B Course" setting (rail out 3 meters), or the "C Course" setting (rail out 7 meters).

1000m, 1400m, 1800m, 2000m, 2500m and 3600m races run on the inner oval, while 1200m, 1600m, 2200m, 2600m and 4000m races run on the outer oval. 3200m races run on the outer oval first, then the inner oval.

The dirt course measures 1493 meters (7/8 mile + 278 feet), with a 1200m chute.

The jump course is unique because several different configurations can be used. In all races, horses must drop and climb over steep embankments at the rear of the course. One particular configuration contains the two most difficult jumps on the course, and is used only a few times a year, particularly for the Nakayama Grand Jump and Nakayama Daishogai races.

Notable races 

Horse racing venues in Japan
Sports venues in Chiba Prefecture
Funabashi
Sports venues completed in 1990
1990 establishments in Japan